Jean-Albert Brasu (born 1898, date of death unknown) was a French equestrian. He competed in two events at the 1956 Summer Olympics.

References

1898 births
Year of death missing
French male equestrians
French dressage riders
Olympic equestrians of France
Equestrians at the 1956 Summer Olympics
Place of birth missing